Caught Dead in Philadelphia is a book written by Gillian Roberts and published by Scribner Press - now owned by Simon & Schuster (originally by Fawcett Publications) - on 16 October 1987 which later went on to win the Anthony Award for Best First Novel in 1988.

References 

Anthony Award-winning works
American mystery novels
1987 novels